Kilmactigue, is a townland and parish in County Sligo, Ireland.

The parish covers the villages of Aclare, Banada and Tourlestrane, as well as their surrounding townlands. The parish church is situated in Tourlestrane, and there are smaller churches in Kilmactigue and Lough Talt. There was also a small church in Banada at the abbey, but it closed when the Banada Abbey secondary school was merged with the Marist Convent secondary school in Tubbercurry.

The parish patron saint is Saint Attracta, who is said to have defeated a dragon that was killing farmers' livestock. A local well is named after her, as is the new secondary school in Tubbercurry.

Townlands of County Sligo
Civil parishes of County Sligo